The Yuchang Tunnel is a  long tunnel located in east Taiwan. The tunnel leads through the Coastal Range. The tunnel is part of the Yuchang Highway, which links Hualien County and Taitung County.

History
It is started construction on 1 September 2001 and was opened to the public on 16 June 2007.

See also
 Transportation in Taiwan

References

2007 establishments in Taiwan
Road tunnels in Taiwan
Transportation in Hualien County
Transportation in Taitung County
Tunnels completed in 2007